Julien Sola (born June 13, 1984) is a French retired professional football player.

External links
 

1984 births
Living people
French footballers
Ligue 2 players
Angers SCO players
Footballers from Paris
AS Moulins players
Championnat National players
Association football midfielders